The name Egay has been used in five tropical cyclones within the Philippines by the PAGASA in the Western Pacific.
 Typhoon Soudelor (2003) (T0306, 07W, Egay) – approached the Philippines, South Korea and Japan.
 Typhoon Sepat (2007) (T0708, 09W, Egay) – struck Taiwan and China.
 Tropical Storm Haima (2011) (T1104, 06W, Egay) – approached the Philippines and Taiwan.
 Severe Tropical Storm Linfa (2015) (T1510, 10W, Egay) – affected south China.
 Tropical Depression 04W (2019) (04W, Egay) – failed to become a tropical storm.

Pacific typhoon set index articles